The Midgets is an album by jazz trumpeter Joe Newman's Septet recorded in 1956 for the RCA Records subsidiary Vik label.

Reception

Allmusic awarded the album 3 stars.

Track listing
All compositions by Ernie Wilkins except as indicated
 "The Midgets" (Joe Newman) - 6:09
 "The Late, Late Show" (Roy Alfred, Murray Berlin) - 2:58
 "Really? Healy!" - 2:52
 "One Lamper" - 3:04
 "She Has Red Hair" - 3:29
 "Valerie" - 2:55	 	 	 	
 "No Moon at All" (Redd Evans, Dave Mann) - 2:46
 "Indeed the Blues" - 3:39
 "Living Dangerously" - 2:50
 "Scooter" - 2:54
 "My Dog Friday" - 3:28
Recorded at Webster Hall in New York City on July 8 (tracks 6, 7, 10 & 11), July 10 (tracks 1, 2 & 8) and July 13 (tracks 3-5 & 9), 1956

Personnel 
Joe Newman- trumpet
Frank Wess - flute
Hank Jones - piano, organ
Barry Galbraith - electric guitar
Freddie Green - rhythm guitar
Eddie Jones - bass
Osie Johnson - drums
Ernie Wilkins - arranger

References 

1956 albums
RCA Records albums
Joe Newman (trumpeter) albums
Instrumental albums